Gorgeh Bisheh-ye Olya (also Romanized as Gorgeh Bīsheh-ye ‘Olyā; also known as Gorg-e Bīsheh-ye Bālā, Gorg-e Bīsheh-ye ‘Olyā, Gurgbishāh, and Gurgbishāh Bāla) is a village in Khodabandehlu Rural District, in the Central District of Sahneh County, Kermanshah Province, Iran. At the 2006 census, its population was 66, in 16 families.

References 

Populated places in Sahneh County